Graham Neil Broadbent is a British film and television producer.

Career

Co-founder of Mission Pictures with Andrew Hauptman and Damien Jones, Graham Broadbent produced Thunderpants (2002) by Peter Hewitt and Piccadilly Jim (2004) by John McKay. More recently, he produced Millions by Danny Boyle, winner of the British Independent Film Award 2005 for Best Screenplay.

He previously created and directed with Damien Jones the production company Dragon Pictures, for which he produced Welcome to Sarajevo (1996) by Michael Winterbottom, shown in the Festival de Cannes 1997, and cited by Time magazine as one of the ten best films of the year, as well as Dancing at the Blue Iguana (2000) by Michael Radford, Some Voices by Simon Cellan Jones, Very Annie Mary (2001) by Sara Sugarman, Splendor (1999) by Gregg Araki, A Texas Funeral by William Blake Herron and The Debt Collector.

In 2004 Broadbent, with Peter John Joseph "Pete" Czernin (born January 1966) , founded the production company Blueprint Pictures. His first two productions were released in 2007: Becoming Jane (2007) by Julian Jarrold, with Anne Hathaway and James McAvoy, and Wind Chill (2006) by Gregory Jacobs, with Emily Blunt, which was co-produced by George Clooney and Steven Soderbergh and In Bruges (2007). Along with Czernin, he has confirmed that he will produce a movie based on the Skulduggery Pleasant series.

Filmography
  The Banshees of Inisherin (2022) (producer)
 A Boy Called Christmas (2021) (producer)
 The Last Letter from Your Lover (2021) (producer)
 Emma. (2020) (producer)
The Guernsey Literary and Potato Peel Pie Society (2018) (producer)
Three Billboards Outside Ebbing, Missouri (2017) (producer)
The Mercy (2016) (producer)
The Second Best Exotic Marigold Hotel (2015) (producer)
The Riot Club (2014) (producer)
Seven Psychopaths (2012) (producer)
The Best Exotic Marigold Hotel (2011) (producer)
In Bruges  (2008) (producer)
Wind Chill (2007) (producer)
Becoming Jane (2007) (producer)
Millions (2004) (producer)
Gladiatress (2004) (producer)
Piccadilly Jim (2004) (producer)
Thunderpants (2002) (producer)
Very Annie Mary (Annie-Mary à la folie! in France) (2001) (TV) (producer) 
Dancing at the Blue Iguana (2000) (producer)
Some Voices (2000) (producer)
A Texas Funeral (1999) (producer)
The Debt Collector (1999) (producer)
Splendor (1999) (producer)
Welcome to Sarajevo (1997) (producer)

References

External links

1965 births
Living people
British film producers
Filmmakers who won the Best Film BAFTA Award
Golden Globe Award-winning producers
Place of birth missing (living people)